The giant betta (Betta anabatoides) is a species of freshwater ray-finned fish in the subfamily Macropodusinae, part of the gourami family. It is endemic to South Kalimanatan, Katingan, and Sampit in Indonesian Borneo. It is found in a variety of freshwater habitats and is a paternal mouthbrooder. The species reaches 8.2 cm (3.2 inches) in standard length and is known to be a facultative air-breather.

References

Giant betta
Taxa named by Pieter Bleeker
Fish described in 1851
Taxobox binomials not recognized by IUCN